The Öland Bridge is a road bridge connecting Kalmar on mainland Sweden to Färjestaden on the island of Öland to its east. It is supported by 156 pillars, and has a characteristic hump at its western end which was created to provide a vertical clearance of 36 m for shipping.

A little to the south of the western end of the bridge a small wooden pedestrian and bicycle bridge, around 150 m in length and connecting the island of Svinö to the mainland, echoes the form of the Öland bridge. This "replica" is clearly visible to anyone crossing to Öland via the main bridge. While the Öresund Bridge linking Sweden with Denmark is longer overall, the Öland Bridge is the longest entirely in Swedish territory.

Construction
The Öland Bridge was inaugurated on 30 September 1972. Among the speakers at the ceremony, which took place on the island side of the bridge, was the Crown Prince Carl Gustaf. The bridge cost 80 million Swedish kronor to build. Construction took 4.5 years, and about 100,000 cubic meters of concrete was used.  The bridge was also prepared for transporting fresh water from the mainland to Öland. The bridge project received much support, but there were also protests. The main objection was that the bridge would threaten the environment, possibly causing a huge influx of tourists to Öland and its vulnerable and precious nature.

See also
 List of bridges
 List of longest bridges in the world

References

External links

 

Bridges completed in 1972
Bridges in Sweden
Öland
Buildings and structures in Kalmar County
1972 establishments in Sweden